The 2018 Liga 3 Jambi is a qualifying round for the national round of 2018 Liga 3. Persijam Jambi, the winner of the 2017 Liga 3 Jambi are the defending champions. The competition will begin on July 1, 2018.

Format 
In this competition, all teams will face each other in home and away match. The winner will represent Jambi in next round.

Teams 
There are 7 teams which will participate the league this season.

References 

2018 in Indonesian football
Seasons in Asian third tier association football leagues